The Varzuga is a river in the south of the Kola Peninsula in Murmansk Oblast, Russia. It is 254 km in length. The area of its basin is 9,840 km². The Varzuga flows into the White Sea. It freezes up in October and stays under the ice until May.

This is the most prolific atlantic salmon fishing river in the whole of the Kola peninsular. Over the season over 10,000 salmon are caught and returned in this river system.
Favourite Salmon fishing patterns are the Kola Vulcan, Kola Blue Fire, Kola Fire and the Kolalander.

References

Rivers of Murmansk Oblast
Drainage basins of the White Sea